Zhang Zhao (156–236), courtesy name Zibu, was a Chinese calligrapher, essayist, military general, and politician. He served as an official of the state of Eastern Wu during the Three Kingdoms period of China. Born in the late Eastern Han dynasty, Zhang Zhao started his career as a scholar in his native Xu Province before the chaos towards the end of the Eastern Han dynasty forced him to flee south to the Jiangdong (or Wu) region for shelter. In Jiangdong, Zhang Zhao became an adviser to the rising warlord Sun Ce. After Sun Ce's death in the year 200, Zhang Zhao played a key supporting role to Sun Ce's younger brother and successor, Sun Quan, as he consolidated power and his control over the Jiangdong territories. In 208, Zhang Zhao strongly urged Sun Quan to surrender to Cao Cao, a rival warlord, because he believed that they stood no chance against an impending invasion by Cao Cao. However, Sun Quan refused to listen to Zhang Zhao and instead heeded the advice of Lu Su and Zhou Yu. Sun Quan's forces ultimately scored a decisive victory over Cao Cao at the Battle of Red Cliffs in the winter of 208. From 200 until his death in 236, Zhang Zhao served under Sun Quan through the collapse of the Eastern Han dynasty and into the Three Kingdoms period after Sun Quan became the founding emperor of the Eastern Wu state. Throughout his career, Zhang Zhao was known for being a stern, uncompromising and intimidating figure who commanded respect from both his colleagues and Sun Quan. Despite Zhang Zhao's seniority and experience, Sun Quan passed him over twice as a candidate for the position of Imperial Chancellor in 222 and 225 as he believed that Zhang Zhao was so headstrong and stubborn that he would not be able to effectively lead the administration. Nevertheless, Sun Quan paid his due respects to Zhang Zhao as a mentor-like figure who saw him through his formative years to his accession to the throne.

Early life
Zhang Zhao was born in the late Eastern Han dynasty in the Pengcheng State, a principality in Xu Province centred around present-day Xuzhou, Jiangsu. As a youth, he was known for being diligent in his studies and for specialising in the clerical script style of calligraphy. He studied the Zuo zhuan and Chunqiu under the tutelage of Bohou Zi'an, and was known for being well read in history. He was also a close friend of two other well-known scholars, Zhao Yu and Wang Lang.

When Zhang Zhao reached the age of adulthood around 19, he was nominated as a xiaolian (civil service candidate) to serve in the government. However, he declined the offer and chose to join Wang Lang in compiling an essay on the ancient use of taboo names. They received praise from other Xu Province scholars, such as Chen Lin, for their work. The essay contradicted the arguments of Ying Shao, another celebrated scholar from Runan Commandery (汝南郡; around present-day central Henan).

Sometime later, when Tao Qian, the Governor of Xu Province, nominated Zhang Zhao as a maocai (茂才; outstanding candidate) to serve in the government, Zhang Zhao declined the offer again. Tao Qian perceived Zhang Zhao's rejection as an insult, so he ordered the latter's arrest. However, Zhao Yu, who was serving in Tao Qian's administration at the time, managed to convince the governor to pardon Zhang Zhao.

Service under Sun Ce
When chaos broke out throughout China in the 190s, many people living in Xu Province fled their homes and crossed the Yangtze River to take shelter in Yang Province (or the Jiangdong region) in the south. Zhang Zhao followed suit and moved from Pengcheng State to Jiangdong.

Between 194 and 199, the warlord Sun Ce conquered the territories in Jiangdong and established his own regime in the region. During this time, he heard of Zhang Zhao and wanted to recruit him as an adviser. After Zhang Zhao agreed and joined him, he was so delighted that he told Zhang Zhao: "Now that I have expanded my domain in all the four corners, I should treat learned and virtuous men with the utmost respect. I won't treat you in any degrading manner." He then appointed Zhang Zhao as a Colonel and honoured him like a teacher.

Later on, Sun Ce made Zhang Zhao his Chief Clerk and promoted him from Colonel to General of the Household Who Pacifies the Army. Apart from paying his respects to Zhang Zhao's mother and treating Zhang Zhao like an old friend, Sun Ce also consulted Zhang Zhao on various matters related to civil and military policy.

Receiving flattering letters
While serving under Sun Ce, Zhang Zhao received several flattering letters from his fellow literati in the north. He faced a dilemma on how to deal with those letters. On one hand, he was afraid that if he kept quiet about those letters, Sun Ce would start questioning his loyalty. On the other hand, he was also worried that others would scorn him for being boastful if he revealed the letters.

When Sun Ce found out, he laughed and told Zhang Zhao: "In the past, when Guan Zhong was the chancellor of Qi, he was called zhongfu. With his help, Duke Huan of Qi became a hegemon among the feudal lords. Today, as I have a virtuous talent like Zibu to assist me, isn't his glory also mine?"

Sun Ce entrusting Sun Quan to Zhang Zhao's care
In the year 200, before Sun Ce died, he entrusted his younger brother and successor, Sun Quan, to Zhang Zhao's care. He told Zhang Zhao: "If Zhongmou turns out to be incompetent, you may replace him. If there is no way to overcome the difficulties, you can gradually retreat back to the west where you will have no worries."

After Sun Ce's death, Zhang Zhao led all of Sun Ce's former subjects to support Sun Quan and pledge their allegiance to him. Zhang Zhao also wrote a memorial to the Han central government to inform them about Sun Ce's death and that Sun Quan had succeeded his brother. He also wrote to all the key appointment holders throughout Sun Quan's domain to order them to continue performing their duties as before.

Service under Sun Quan

Assisting Sun Quan in consolidating power
When an 18-year-old Sun Quan first came to power, he was so overwhelmed with grief over his brother's death that he spent his time mourning instead of taking charge of the regime established by his brother in Jiangdong. Zhang Zhao told him: 

Sun Quan's biography in the Sanguozhi recorded that Zhang Zhao told the young Sun Quan: 

Sun Quan heeded Zhang Zhao's advice. He changed out of his mourning attire, got onto horseback with Zhang Zhao's help, and inspected his troops as they assembled in formation. Sun Ce's former subjects accepted Sun Quan's leadership and pledged their allegiance to him. Sun Quan also appointed Zhang Zhao as his Chief Clerk and ordered him to perform the same duties as he did under Sun Ce.

With Zhang Zhao's assistance, Sun Quan managed to consolidate his control over the unstable Jiangdong regime left behind by Sun Ce. Apart from pacifying and winning over the people, he also recruited many talented and capable persons to serve in his administration. Whenever Sun Quan went into battle, he left Zhang Zhao behind to guard his base and oversee day-to-day affairs in the Jiangdong territories. During this time, Zhang Zhao suppressed an uprising by remnants of the Yellow Turban rebels.

Battle of Jiangxia

In the spring of 208, Gan Ning, who had recently joined Sun Quan, pointed out to Sun Quan that Cao Cao, the warlord who controlled the Han central government and most of northern China, was planning to attack Jing Province (covering present-day Hubei and Hunan) to the west of the Jiangdong (or Wu) territories. He also noted that Liu Biao, the Governor of Jing Province, was incapable of defending his domain, so it would be better for Sun Quan to seize Jing Province before Cao Cao could do so. The first step in Gan Ning's plan was to attack Jiangxia Commandery (江夏郡; around present-day Wuhan, Hubei), which was guarded by Liu Biao's subordinate Huang Zu.

Sun Quan approved Gan Ning's plan, but Zhang Zhao strongly objected and said: "The territories in Wu have not been completely pacified yet. If we proceed with this campaign, I am afraid there will be chaos." Gan Ning rebuked Zhang Zhao: "Our lord has entrusted responsibilities to you as if you were Xiao He. If you can't even be confident that there won't be chaos under your watch, how can you expect to be like Xiao He?"

Sun Quan ignored Zhang Zhao and put Gan Ning in charge of planning and leading the campaign. They emerged victorious in the campaign as they killed Huang Zu in battle and conquered Jiangxia Commandery.

Battle of Red Cliffs

In the late autumn of 208, Cao Cao launched a military campaign aimed at eliminating all forces in southern China who opposed him. He swiftly conquered Jing Province (covering present-day Hubei and Hunan) after the provincial governor Liu Cong surrendered without a fight. When Sun Quan's subjects heard that Cao Cao had gained control of Jing Province along with its tens of thousands of land and naval troops, they became fearful as they knew that Cao Cao's next target was Sun Quan's territories in the Jiangdong region. Sun Quan summoned them for a meeting and showed them a threatening letter he received from Cao Cao, in which Cao Cao claimed that he had 800,000 troops.

Some of Sun Quan's subjects, including Zhang Zhao and Qin Song, suggested that Sun Quan surrender to Cao Cao because, in their opinion, they could not win a battle against Cao Cao. However, Sun Quan ultimately heeded the advice of Lu Su and Zhou Yu and hardened his decision to go to war with Cao Cao. He also told Lu Su and Zhou Yu privately that he was deeply disappointed with Zhang Zhao, Qin Song and those who advised him to surrender to Cao Cao. After making up his mind, he summoned all his subjects, drew his sword, slashed the table in front of him and said: "Any of you who dares to speak of surrendering to Cao Cao shall end up like this table!"

In the winter of 208–209, Sun Quan and his ally Liu Bei scored a decisive victory over Cao Cao at the decisive Battle of Red Cliffs. After the Battle of Red Cliffs, while Zhou Yu led Sun Quan's forces to attack Cao Cao's garrison at Jiangling, Sun Quan personally led another army to attack Hefei, a heavily fortified city under Cao Cao's control. During the campaign, he ordered Zhang Zhao to lead a separate detachment of troops to assault Kuangqi, another of Cao Cao's fortresses in Guangling Commandery (廣陵郡; around present-day Huai'an, Jiangsu). Sun Quan and Zhang Zhao did not manage to capture Hefei and Kuangqi, while Zhou Yu successfully conquered Jiangling.

Zhang Zhao later led Sun Quan's forces to attack and eliminate bandit forces led by Zhou Feng in Yuzhang Commandery (豫章郡; around present-day Nanchang, Jiangxi). After this battle, Zhang Zhao hardly assumed positions of military command again as Sun Quan decided to keep him by his side as a strategist and adviser. Sun Quan also treated him very respectfully because of his senior status in the administration.

In late 209 or early 210, after Sun Quan received the appointment of acting General of Chariots and Cavalry from the Han central government through Liu Bei's nomination, he appointed Zhang Zhao as his Army Adviser.

Lecturing Sun Quan on hunting excursions
Sun Quan enjoyed going on hunting excursions as a leisure activity. On one occasion, while he was hunting a tiger on horseback with a bow and arrows, the tiger suddenly attacked him and clawed at his saddle.

When Zhang Zhao heard about it, he lectured Sun Quan:  Sun Quan then apologised to Zhang Zhao: "I am young and lacking in wisdom. Sir, I am sorry for letting you down."

Despite being lectured, Sun Quan was unwilling to give up on his favourite pastime so he designed a chariot for his hunting excursions. The chariot had squarish openings but no roof. Accompanied by only a driver to drive the chariot, Sun Quan fired arrows at wild beasts through the openings. When they encountered animals who left their packs/herds and came very close to the chariot, Sun Quan got out and took pleasure in hand-to-hand combat with the animal. When Zhang Zhao found out, he repeatedly urged Sun Quan to stop engaging in such dangerous activities but the latter laughed and ignored him.

Service under the King of Wu
In late 220, Cao Cao's son and successor Cao Pi usurped the throne from Emperor Xian, ended the Eastern Han dynasty and established the state of Cao Wei (or Wei) with himself as the emperor. This event marked the beginning of the Three Kingdoms period in China.

In September 221, Sun Quan pledged nominal allegiance to Cao Pi and agreed to become a vassal of Wei. In return, Cao Pi sent an emissary, Xing Zhen, to confer the title "King of Wu" on Sun Quan. On 23 September that year, when Xing Zhen arrived at Wuchang (武昌; present-day Ezhou, Hubei), the capital of Sun Quan's domain, for the conferment ceremony, he did not dismount from his carriage when he reached the city gates. Zhang Zhao told him:  Upon hearing what Zhang Zhao said, Xing Zhen immediately got off the carriage and entered the city on foot.

After Sun Quan became the King of Wu, he awarded Zhang Zhao the appointment of General Who Pacifies Distant Lands and the peerage of Marquis of Youquan. Zhang Zhao, along with Sun Shao, Teng Yin, Zheng Li and others, drafted the rules of imperial protocol for the Kingdom of Wu based on those of the Zhou and Han dynasties.

Lecturing Sun Quan on making merry
When Sun Quan was in Wuchang (武昌; present-day Ezhou, Hubei), he once hosted a drinking party on a terrace and invited all his subjects to attend. He ordered his servants to splash water at everyone, after which he jokingly declared: "The party shall not end until everyone gets dead drunk."

Zhang Zhao did not say anything, put on a stern face, walked out of the party, and sat inside his carriage alone. Sun Quan sent someone to ask him to come back, and then asked him: "This is a time for all of us to make merry and be happy. Sir, why are you angry?" Zhang Zhao replied:  Sun Quan fell silent and looked embarrassed after hearing Zhang Zhao's words. He then called off the party.

Not chosen to be Imperial Chancellor
In November 222, Sun Quan broke ties with Cao Pi and declared himself an independent ruler of his Kingdom of Wu by adopting an era name for his reign. After that, he wanted to create the position of Imperial Chancellor in his government, so he consulted his subjects on suitable candidates to fill in this post. Although all of them came to the consensus that Zhang Zhao was the best candidate, Sun Quan said: "We are living in times of chaos. Such key appointments are to be filled by persons capable of shouldering great responsibilities; they shouldn't be treated like honorary positions." Sun Quan ultimately selected Sun Shao to be the first Imperial Chancellor of Wu.

After Sun Shao died in office in the summer of 225, Sun Quan's subjects nominated Zhang Zhao to succeed Sun Shao as Imperial Chancellor. However, Sun Quan refused again and said: "It's not that I am being unkind towards Zibu (by not choosing him). The person holding the position of Imperial Chancellor has to deal with so many issues on a daily basis. (Zhang Zhao) is too headstrong. If people don't listen to him, there will be a lot of conflicts. It won't be helpful at all." He then chose Gu Yong to be the second Imperial Chancellor of Wu.

Service under the Emperor of Wu
In the summer of 229, after Sun Quan declared himself emperor of Wu, Zhang Zhao retired from active service on the grounds of old age and poor health. He resigned from his position as General Who Pacifies Distant Lands and returned command of his troops to the Wu government.

Sun Quan embarrassing Zhang Zhao in public
According to the Jiang Biao Zhuan, although Sun Quan highly respected Zhang Zhao for his loyal, bold and forthright character, he never forgot that Zhang Zhao had advised him to surrender to Cao Cao before the Battle of Red Cliffs. After he became emperor, he told all his subjects: "I wouldn't have become an emperor today if there wasn't Zhou Yu to assist me." Just as Zhang Zhao prepared to hold up his hu and congratulate Sun Quan, the emperor remarked: "If I had listened to Lord Zhang, I'd be begging for food today." Zhang Zhao felt deeply embarrassed and he broke out in a cold sweat as he sank to his knees.

Pei Songzhi, in his annotations to Zhang Zhao's biography in the Sanguozhi, argued that Zhang Zhao had never intended to help Sun Ce or Sun Quan become rulers in their own right; all he desired was to assist them in bringing peace to the common people living under their control. When he saw that Cao Cao had pacified northern China and conquered Jing Province just before the Battle of Red Cliffs, he advised Sun Quan to surrender to Cao Cao because he saw that as an opportunity for the fragmented Han Empire to be reunified under Cao Cao's control. If the Han Empire were reunified, there would be no more conflicts among the warlords, and the common people would finally be able to live in peace. Pei Songzhi thus concluded that although Zhang Zhao may not be considered loyal towards Sun Quan, he had the greater interests of the common people at heart.

The Australian sinologist Rafe de Crespigny believed that this account from the Jiang Biao Zhuan is probably false because Sun Quan stood to gain little for his own reputation and authority from making such an extraordinary public insult at Zhang Zhao.

Life in retirement
Although Zhang Zhao had effectively retired, Sun Quan still gave him an honorary position as General Who Assists Wu, whose status was just below the Three Ducal Ministers in the hierarchy of the Eastern Wu government. Sun Quan also changed Zhang Zhao's peerage from the Marquis of Youquan to the Marquis of Lou, and awarded him a marquisate comprising 10,000 taxable households.

Zhang Zhao stayed at home after retiring and he spent his time writing a guide to the Zuo zhuan and an annotated copy of the Analects.

Sun Quan once asked Yan Jun to recite something he memorised in his childhood. Yan Jun thus recited "The Scope and Meaning of the Treatise", the opening paragraph of the Classic of Filial Piety. Zhang Zhao, who was also present, remarked: "Yan Jun is a mediocre scholar. I humbly seek permission to recite for Your Majesty." After Sun Quan approved, Zhang Zhao recited "The Service of the Ruler", another paragraph in the Classic of Filial Piety. Sun Quan's other subjects agreed that Zhang Zhao had a good understanding of what he should recite in front of the emperor.

Quarrel with Sun Quan
Zhang Zhao was known for being very outspoken, forthright and blunt in his speech whenever he spoke up in Sun Quan's imperial court. On one occasion, after he openly defied an order from Sun Quan, he was not allowed to enter the imperial court for some time.

During this time, Wu's ally state Shu sent an ambassador to Wu for an official visit. The Shu ambassador sang praises about Shu in front of Sun Quan and his imperial court. Some Wu officials tried to challenge the Shu ambassador but failed. Sun Quan sighed: "If Lord Zhang were here, (the Shu ambassador) would feel intimidated before he could even debate with us, much less boast about his state!"

The following day, Sun Quan sent a messenger to visit Zhang Zhao at his residence and invite him back to the imperial court. When Zhang Zhao showed up, he apologised to Sun Quan but refused to take his seat, so Sun Quan knelt down and begged him to stop. Zhang Zhao then sat down, with his eyes looking up, and said:  Sun Quan apologised to him and left.

Quarrel with Sun Quan over the Liaodong issue
In 233, the Liaodong-based warlord Gongsun Yuan pledged allegiance to Sun Quan and expressed willingness to become a vassal of Eastern Wu. Sun Quan was delighted as he saw Gongsun Yuan as a potential ally against Wu's rival state, Wei. He then wanted to send Zhang Mi and Xu Yan as his representatives to Liaodong to meet Gongsun Yuan and grant him the title "King of Yan". However, Zhang Zhao strongly objected and said: 

Sun Quan and Zhang Zhao had a heated quarrel over this issue; Zhang Zhao, adamant that he was right, stubbornly refused to yield. Sun Quan eventually lost his temper, placed his hand on the hilt of his sword, and angrily told Zhang Zhao: "When the people of Wu enter the palace, they pay respects to me. Outside the palace, they pay respects to you. My respect for you has already reached the maximum possible extent, yet you humiliate me in front of everyone. I am really afraid that I will lose control of myself and end up hurting you." Zhang Zhao stared at Sun Quan for some time before replying:  He then broke down in tears. Sun Quan dropped his sword and started crying too.

When Sun Quan ultimately sent Zhang Mi and Xu Yan to Liaodong, Zhang Zhao felt so frustrated with the emperor for not heeding his advice that he claimed that he was sick and refused to show up in the imperial court. An angry Sun Quan then ordered the entrance of Zhang Zhao's residence to be sealed by piling up earth in front of it to block people from entering or leaving. In response, Zhang Zhao also ordered his servants to pile up earth too and block the entrance from the inside.

In the autumn of 233, Gongsun Yuan betrayed Sun Quan and executed Zhang Mi and Xu Yan. When Sun Quan heard about it, he realised that he was in the wrong. After Zhang Zhao ignored his apologies several times, Sun Quan personally went to Zhang Zhao's residence and called him to come out but Zhang Zhao refused and claimed that he was ill. Sun Quan then set fire to the entrance of Zhang Zhao's residence to scare him and force him to come out. His plan backfired as Zhang Zhao not only refused to come out, but also shut all the doors and windows of his residence. Left with no choice, Sun Quan ordered his servants to put out the fire, and he stood at the entrance for a long time. Zhang Zhao's sons then helped their father out, while Sun Quan arranged for a carriage to fetch Zhang Zhao to his palace. At the palace, Sun Quan apologised profusely to Zhang Zhao, who finally forgave him and returned to work.

The Jin dynasty historian Xi Zuochi praised Sun Quan for acknowledging his mistake and doing his best to show his remorse and apologise to Zhang Zhao. However, he also criticised Zhang Zhao for his pompous and condescending attitude towards Sun Quan. He argued that Zhang Zhao, as a subject of a ruler, should know his place and refrain from pushing things to such an extreme even if he was right.

Death
Throughout his life, Zhang Zhao was known for maintaining a dignified and solemn appearance, and for having an awe-inspiring bearing. His colleagues in the Wu imperial court saw him as an intimidating figure. Sun Quan once said: "When I speak to Lord Zhang, I don't dare to say anything in jest."

Zhang Zhao died at the age of 81 (by East Asian age reckoning) in 236 during the Jiahe era (232–238) of Sun Quan's reign. Before he died, he gave instructions that he wanted to be buried in a coffin of simple design and to be dressed in plain clothes. Sun Quan donned mourning garments and attended his funeral in person. He also honoured Zhang Zhao with the posthumous title "Marquis Wen".

Family
Zhang Zhao was survived by at least two sons, who both served as military generals in Eastern Wu. His first son, Zhang Cheng, had already received a peerage of his own, so his second son Zhang Xiu inherited his peerage and became the next Marquis of Lou.

Zhang Zhao's nephew, Zhang Fen, designed a war chariot to serve as a siege engine when he was only 19. Bu Zhi recognised his talent and recommended him to serve in the Wu army. However, Zhang Zhao disapproved as he told Zhang Fen: "You are still young. Why do you want to put yourself through hardship by serving in the army?" Zhang Fen replied: "In the past, Wang the boy died a hero while Ziqi governed E. I may be untalented but I am no longer young." He then served in the army and rose through the ranks to become a general. The highest appointment he held was Chief Controller of Pingzhou. He was also enfeoffed as the Marquis of Lexiang Village.

Appraisal
Chen Shou, who wrote Zhang Zhao's biography in the Sanguozhi, appraised him as follows: "Zhang Zhao received a mission to assist (Sun Quan). His contributions were outstanding. He was loyal, outspoken and upright; his actions were not for his own interests. However, he was feared because he was too stern, and he was shunned by others because he liked to assume the moral high ground. He was given neither the role of a chancellor nor an imperial tutor. Instead, he had a rather unimpressive career and spent his old age in retirement. This shows that Sun Quan was not as wise as Sun Ce."

The Dianlue recorded that Liu Biao, the governor of Jing Province, once wrote a letter to Sun Ce. Before sending, he showed it to Mi Heng, who disdainfully remarked: "Is this letter for children in Sun Ce's domain to read out? Or is it for Zhang Zibu's perusal?" This remark showed that even the notoriously haughty Mi Heng acknowledged Zhang Zhao's literary talent.

In Romance of the Three Kingdoms

Zhang Zhao's fictionalised persona in the 14th-century historical novel Romance of the Three Kingdoms is generally similar to its historical counterpart. In the novel, he first appears in Chapter 15 when Zhou Yu recommends him and Zhang Hong (not related to Zhang Zhao), who are collectively referred to as the "Two Zhangs" of Jiangdong", as talents to assist Sun Ce. Sun Ce then visited them at their homes and succeeded in recruiting them to serve as his advisers. In Chapter 29, when Sun Ce is about to die, he says that if Sun Quan cannot make decisions on domestic and external issues, he can consult Zhang Zhao and Zhou Yu respectively.

In chapters 43 to 49, when Sun Quan is discussing with his subjects about how to counter an impending invasion by Cao Cao just before the Battle of Red Cliffs, his subjects are divided into two camps: one advocating surrender to Cao Cao, and the other advocating going to war with Cao Cao. Zhang Zhao is one of the leading figures in the former camp. Chapter 43, in particular, describes a fictitious debate between Zhuge Liang and the various scholar-officials serving under Sun Quan. Zhang Zhao is the first among those scholar-officials to challenge Zhuge Liang, who manages to silence all of them through his eloquent responses to their queries and comments, as well as taunts and insults.

See also
 Lists of people of the Three Kingdoms

Notes

References

 Chen, Shou (3rd century). Records of the Three Kingdoms (Sanguozhi).
 
 Luo, Guanzhong (14th century). Romance of the Three Kingdoms (Sanguo Yanyi).
 Pei, Songzhi (5th century). Annotations to Records of the Three Kingdoms (Sanguozhi zhu).
 

156 births
236 deaths
Generals from Jiangsu
Eastern Wu calligraphers
Eastern Wu essayists
Eastern Wu generals
Eastern Wu politicians
Han dynasty calligraphers
Han dynasty politicians from Jiangsu
Officials under Sun Quan
Politicians from Xuzhou
Sun Ce and associates
Writers from Xuzhou